Discovery Island is a small privately owned island off the coast of Nassau.  The western portion of the Island is Balmoral Island, a shore excursion for Royal Caribbean cruise lines.  The eastern portion is Sandals Island and is owned by the Sandals Grand Bahamian Resort.

External links
 Balmoral Island official site
 Sandals offshore island official site

Private islands of the Bahamas